Eason is a surname.

The name comes from Aythe where the first recorded spelling of the family name is that of Aythe Filius Thome which was dated circa 1630, in the "Baillie of Stratherne". Aythe filius Thome received a charter of the lands of Fornochtis in Strathearn from Robert the Steward (later known as Robert II) around 1360. The next of the line was called Johem ayson iuuene. The surname Ayson seems to be a derivative from "Aythe's son". The spelling and pronunciation changed over time, until it reached the modern form of Eason and its variants.

Most Eason families are found in the United States, England, Canada and Scotland. New Zealand has the highest percentage of Easons per capita in the world.

There are many variants of the surname, including Easton, Easson, and Esson.

People with the surname

Alec Eason (1889–1956), Australian rules footballer
Andre Eason (born 1975), American boxer
B. Reeves Eason (1886–1956), American film director, actor and screenwriter
B. Reeves Eason Jr. (1914–1921), American child actor, son of the above
Bill Eason (1882–1957), Australian rules footballer
Bo Eason (born 1960), American National Football League safety
Cordera Eason (born 1987), American football running back
Doc Eason (born 1947), American magician
Eric Eason, American film director and screenwriter
Herbert Lightfoot Eason (1874–1949), British ophthalmic surgeon and  Vice Chancellor of the University of London
Jacob Eason (born 1997), American college football quarterback
Jamie Eason (born 1976), American fitness model and writer
Jim Eason, American radio personality
Mal Eason (1879–1970), American baseball pitcher and umpire
Nick Eason (born 1980), American former National Football League defensive end and current assistant coach
Roger Eason (1918–1988), American National Football League player
Tari Eason (born 2001), American basketball player
Tony Eason (born 1959), American National Football League quarterback
Ursula Eason (1910–1993), British radio broadcaster, television producer and administrator

People with the given name

Eason Chan (born 1974), Hong Kong singer and actor
Eason Jordan, American businessman and former CNN chief news executive
Eason Ramson (born 1956), American National Football League tight end

See also
Eason & Son, Irish bookstore chain

References

External links 

 Eason One-Name Study